The Sabie River is a river in South Africa that forms part of the Komati River System. The catchment area of the Sabie-Sand system is 6,320 km2 in extent. The Sabie is one of the most biologically diverse rivers in South Africa, with generally good water quality.

Course
It rises in the Drakensberg escarpment of Mpumalanga province, flowing eastwards into the lowveld. It crosses the breadth of the Kruger National Park before cutting through the Lebombo range into Mozambique. Some 40 km from Moamba it enters the large Corumana Dam before finally joining the Komati. Settlements on its banks include Sabie, Hazyview, Skukuza and Lower Sabie.

Tributaries
Tributaries of the Sabie include:
Klein Sabie River
Mac Mac River
Marite River, its tributary is:
Ngwaritsana River
Motitse River
Mhlambanyatsi River (in Kruger Park)
N'waswitshaka River (at Skukuza)
N'watindlopfu Spruit (in Kruger Park)
N'watinwambu River (in Kruger Park)
Sabane River
Sand River (in Kruger Park)

References

Rivers of Mpumalanga